The Rufus River Massacre was a massacre of 30–40 Aboriginal people that took place in 1841 along the Rufus River, in the Central Murray region, after three consecutive ambushes with "overlanders" (stock drovers) on the recently opened overland stock route, which followed an old Aboriginal route. The massacre occurred after an official party, including Protector of Aborigines, Matthew Moorhouse, along with police, was sent out by the Governor of South Australia, George Grey.

Background
The short Rufus River connects Lake Victoria, New South Wales with the Murray River, very close to both the current borders with Victoria to the south and South Australia to the west.

The local Maraura people probably had their first encounter with Europeans when Charles Sturt travelled down the river in 1830. There is no record of other Europeans in the region until overlanders Joseph Hawdon and Charles Bonney drove 335 cattle from Sydney to Adelaide along the Murray River in 1838. Edward Eyre and Sturt followed this stock route, and by April 1841 at least 36 European parties had travelled the track, bringing with them about 480 people, 90,000 sheep and 15,000 cattle, as well as horses, bullocks, drays and goods into Aboriginal territories. The route followed well-established Aboriginal pathways, and various skirmishes were reported as the Europeans travelled through the region.

Conflicts
Two of the party were killed and one injured. A group of volunteers, including a member of the original party, Henry Field, set out to recover the sheep on 7 May. They too were attacked.

Governor  Grey swore in a batch of special constables under the jurisdiction of Major Thomas O’Halloran and the Protector of Aborigines, Matthew Moorhouse. A large party of men, including police under the command of James Rigby Beevor, left Adelaide on 31 May. They met up with another group of overlanders, led by Alfred Langhorne, on 22 June, who had been attacked two days earlier at the Rufus River. Four Europeans and five Aboriginal people had been killed, with two and about ten injured in each group respectively.

Massacre

Another official party, including police, three Aboriginal people and Moorhouse, again left for the Murray in July 1841, meeting up in August with another group of overlanders, led by William Robinson, who had earlier been attacked. In that conflict, no Europeans had been hurt, but five Aboriginal men had been killed and 10 wounded. Coming across a large group of local men and women near Lake Victoria, Moorhouse and two others became involved in another clash, despite Moorhouse’s attempts to negotiate through interpreters. According to Moorhouse's report later sent to Grey, "nearly 30" Aboriginal people were killed, "about 10" wounded and four captured and four (one man, one boy, and two females) taken prisoner. A large majority of the wounded would be expected to die from their wounds, because Aboriginal medicine was ill-equipped to deal with gunshot wounds. Only one European was wounded.

A subsequent enquiry headed by Sturt questioned the participants, including the Aboriginal interpreter and  one of the captives, but eventually declared that the actions of the European parties had been justifiable. It determined original cause of much of the trouble with the Robinson group was the Europeans engaging in sexual relations with the women without giving the food and clothing promised first. That initiated an escalating cycle of conflicts, which eventually included the Aboriginal groups stealing thousands of European sheep. Moorhouse testified that about 150 Aborigines appeared to be readying to attack, and that the massacre was committed to pre-empt such an attack.

Moorhouse's report was disputed by Robinson, who stated that "thirty to forty were killed, and as many wounded", and later by James Collins Hawker, who wrote in his book Early Experiences in South Australia (1899: p. 79): "The firing lasted about fifteen minutes, 30 natives were killed, 10 wounded and 4 taken prisoner ... This was the Protector's report but in after years when I was residing on the Murray and had learnt the language of the natives, I ascertained that a much larger number had been killed..."

See also
 Australian frontier wars
List of massacres of Indigenous Australians
Maria (brigantine)

References

Further reading
 "Papers Relative To The Affairs Of South Australia—Aborigines", Accounts and Papers 1843, Volume 3 (London: William Clowes and Sons), p. 267-310.
 "Fatal recontre with the Murray natives", South Australian Register, p. 2, 11 September 1841. [This report is also available via Trove. ]
 .
 .
 .
 Clyne  R.  (1981), "At  war  with  the  natives:  From  the  Coorong  to  the  Rufus,  1841", Journal of the Historical Society of South Australia, 9: 91-110. 
 Eyre E.J. (1845), Journals of Expeditions of Discovery into Central Australia, and overland from Adelaide to King George's Sound, in the years 1840-41, sent by the Colonists of Australia, with the sanction and support of the Government; including an Account of the Manners and Customs of the Aborigines, and the state of their relations with Europeans, Volume I and Volume II (London: T. and W. Boone). Republished by Cambridge University Press (2011).
 Mattingley C., Hampton K. (1988), Survival in Our Own Land, p. 38-40.
 Nettlebeck A. (1999), "Mythologising frontier: Narrative versions of the Rufus River conflict, 1841‐1899", Journal of Australian Studies, 23: 75-82; .
.
 Sturt C. (1849), Narrative of an Expedition into Central Australia, p. 92 (London: T. and W. Boone).
 Summers J. (1986),  "Colonial race relations", The Flinders History of South Australia: social history (editor – E. Richards), p. 283-311 (Wakefield Press). 
 Watson F. (1924), Historical Records of Australia—Series I, Volume XXI (October 1840 – March 1842), p. 695-701 (Sydney: Library Committee of the Commonwealth Parliament). [Letter from Lord Stanley to Sir George Gipps, 21 February 1842.]
 Watson F. (1924), Historical Records of Australia—Series I, Volume XXII (April 1842 – June 1843), p. 39-40 (Sydney: Library Committee of the Commonwealth Parliament). [Letters from Lord Stanley, 13 May 1842.]
 Wigley M. (2006), Ready Money: The life of William Robinson of Hill River, South Australia and Cheviot Hills, North Canterbury (Christchurch: Canterbury University Press).

External links
SA Protector of Aborigines: Out Letter Book I (May 21, 1840 to Jan 6, 1857)  —First Sources
Some Known Conflicts in New South Wales  —Australian Frontier Conflicts
Sign Sites - Palmer Gardens / Pangki Pangki  —City of Adelaide
Colonial Frontier Massacres in Central and Eastern Australia 1788-1930  —University of Newcastle (Australia)

1841 in Australia
Conflicts in 1841
August 1841 events
Massacres in 1841
Massacres of Indigenous Australians